The Malessu' Pillbox is a World War II-era Japanese-built defensive fortification on the shore of Merizo, Guam. Its gun port has a view of the Merizo pier, and is approximately at ground level. It was built by Japanese defenders during their occupation of the island 1941–44.

The structure was listed on the National Register of Historic Places in 1991.

See also
National Register of Historic Places listings in Guam

References

Buildings and structures on the National Register of Historic Places in Guam
World War II on the National Register of Historic Places in Guam
1940s establishments in Guam
Pillboxes (military)